"Sissy's Song" is a song written and recorded by American country music singer Alan Jackson.  It was released in March 2008 as the fourth single from his album Good Time, and his fifty-sixth single release overall (and to date his last solo top ten hit). Jackson wrote the song after the sudden death of a housekeeper that worked at his house.

Composition
"Sissy's Song" is an acoustic mid-tempo country ballad, written by Jackson as a tribute to a housekeeper named Leslie "Sissy" Fitzgerald, who worked daily at Jackson's house. Jackson wrote the song after Sissy died in a motorcycle accident on May 20, 2007. He then went to the recording studio, and working with longtime producer Keith Stegall, made a recording of the song with just his vocals and steel-string acoustic guitar to be played for the family at her funeral. The song expresses Jackson's feeling for Sissy, in addition to hoping that "she flew up to heaven on the wings of angels."

Critical reception
Karlie Justus, of Engine 145, gave the song a "thumbs up" rating. She said that the song was both "deeply personal and universally relatable", and that it showed his sense for simplicity and authenticity. However, she considered some of the lyrics stilted and cliché in nature. Lynn Douglas, reviewing the song for Country Universe, gave it a B+ rating. She described the song as "a reflective and moving experience."

Music video
The song's music video was directed by Scott Scovill. It is shot in black-and-white and is at a church and it features footage of Jackson performing the song. It was shot in a historic church, located south of Nashville.

Chart performance
"Sissy's Song" debuted at number 45 on the U.S. Billboard Hot Country Songs for the chart week of February 28, 2009.

References

External links
Music video at CMT

2009 singles
Alan Jackson songs
Songs written by Alan Jackson
Commemoration songs
Country ballads
Song recordings produced by Keith Stegall
Arista Nashville singles
Black-and-white music videos
2008 songs